Maria Francesca Nascinbeni (1658–1680) was an Italian composer. She studied in Ancona, Italy, with Augustinian monk Scipio Lazzarini. He included her motet "Sitientes venite" and works by two of his other students in his "Motetti a due e tre voce." At age sixteen (December 1674) Nascinbeni published one volume of music including songs, canzonas, madrigals and motets for organ and one, two and three voices. All that is known of her life is from the prefaces to her music volumes.

Notes 
1.She also spelled her last name as "Nascimbeni".

References

External links

Facsimile of Canzoni e Madrigali morale e spirituali (1674) via Museo internazionale e biblioteca della musica

Italian Baroque composers
Italian women classical composers
1640s births
1680 deaths
17th-century Italian composers
17th-century Italian women
17th-century women composers